Le Pont-de-Claix (literally The Bridge of Claix) is a commune in the Isère department in southeastern France. It is part of the Grenoble urban unit (agglomeration).

Population

International relations

Le Pont-de-Claix is twinned with:
  Winsen, Germany

See also
Communes of the Isère department

References

Communes of Isère
Isère communes articles needing translation from French Wikipedia